Koninklijke Lierse Sportkring, often simply known as Lierse, was a Belgian professional football club from the city of Lier in the Antwerp province. Lierse have won four championship titles and two Belgian Cups. Lierse was one of the six Belgian clubs to have played in the UEFA Champions League group stage, the other being Anderlecht, Club Brugge, Genk, Standard Liège and KAA Gent.

The club was founded in 1906 and they first promoted to the first division in 1927–28. Lierse was successful in the first division until the end of World War II, winning two titles and finishing only four times outside the top five. At the end of the 1947–48 season, they were relegated to the second division. Lierse enjoyed two more spells at the highest level, each time with a championship win (between 1953–54 and 1985–86 and between 1988–89 and 2006–07). Lierse spent five more years in first division between 2010–11 and 2014–15, but since then played in the second division.

Lierse played their home matches at the Herman Vanderpoortenstadion in Lier, which is also known as Het Lisp, because the stadium is located in a neighbourhood named Lisp. They had yellow and black colours. The club was bought by Egyptian businessman Maged Samy, who also owns KV Turnhout and Wadi Degla in Egypt.

The most capped player at the club is Bernard Voorhoof with 61 caps for Belgium, all when he was at Lierse. With 30 goals, he was the topscorer of the Belgium national football team together with Paul Van Himst, until Romelu Lukaku (who played in Lierse's youth squads) surpassed this record.

On May 9, 2018, the team announced that it requested bankruptcy.

After the bankruptcy of the team, negotiations started with Lyra and Oosterzonen. Eventually two teams with the name Lierse were formed: K. Lyra-Lierse and K. Lierse Kempenzonen. K. Lierse Kempenzonen will play with the old Lierse S.K. logo at the Herman Vanderpoortenstadion.

History

The early years 
In 1904, Gustaaf Van Den Roye learned about the game of football in Antwerp and got fascinated about it. He bought an authentic ball to play the game in his hometown of Lier. The first games were played on a terrain owned by the local graf Marnix de Sainte-Aldegonde. Local farmers were not pleased and the police had to intervene, who prohibited any further games. The graf was informed of what happened and he asked Van Den Roye to come and see him. When Van Den Roye told the Graf about his intent to start an actual football club and pointed out the difficulties he was faced with, The Graf promised him a terrain which could serve as a football ground.

On March 6, 1906, during a meeting in a local pub called De Roskam a football club was founded, named Liersche Sportkring.  Lierse was born and a first board was established: Gerard Quaeyhaegens as chairman, Gust van den Roye as secretary and Georges Peeters as Treasurer. Graf Marnix de Sainte-Aldegonde agreed to become honorary chairman.

Two years after its foundation, in September 1908, Lierse became a member of the Royal Belgian Football Association, where it started playing in the lowest tier of Belgian Football. In 1913 the club made its first impact in Belgian football, when it became the first club ever out a regional league to reach the quarter-finals of the Belgian Cup.  The club climbed through the ranks of Belgian football.  In 1922, after winning a national play-off round Lierse gained promotion to the national levels of Belgian Football, which they would never leave until present.

1927–1948: First spell at the highest level 
Five years after reaching the national levels, in 1927, Lierse became champions in division 1 the second tier of Belgian football, with a 2 points advantage over RSC Anderlecht. In doing so, Lierse succeeded promotion to the highest level for the first time in its history. This first spell in the top tier proved to be very successful immediately as Lierse became champions for the first time in 1932. In the 12 seasons that followed they finished only 1 time outside the top 5, becoming runner up in 1935 and 1939, and winning the championship again in 1941 (unofficial due to World War II) and 1942.

One of the major factors of the success of the club in this period was Bernard Voorhoof, who scored 350 goals in 529 matches for the club. He was voted "Lierse player of the century" when the club celebrated its 100th anniversary in 2006. Until now Voorhoof is also still the topscorer of the Belgium national football team with 30 goals in 61 matches and he is one of the four players worldwide to have competed in all 3 FIFA World Cups before World War II.

The second World War had its impact on the club though.  2 players of the club, national goalkeeper Frans Christiaens and Frans Vervoort died during allied bombardments on a factory in German-occupied Mortsel. Also Jules Van Craen, topscorer of the Belgian League in the 1943 season died during the war. In the season 1944–45 Lierse, together with three other clubs from the Antwerp area, did not compete in the league, due to the German bombardments on the Port of Antwerp. These facts, combined with some of the older players retiring caused the club to decline until they finished bottom of the league in 1948. After 21 years at the highest level, Lierse were relegated for the first time in its history.

1953–2018 
In 1953, Lierse secured promotion to the highest level once again.

In 1960, K. Lierse S.K won their third championship title, and distinguished themselves at European level.

In 1969, Lierse won the Belgian Cup for the first time.

September 21, 1971, is considered an important day for Lierse. Two weeks earlier, Lierse had lost 0–2 at home to the far superior Leeds United in the first round of the UEFA Cup. Nobody expected that Lierse would win in Leeds, but Lierse had an improbably 0–4 win, and Leeds, the Cup holders, were knocked out.

In 1986, Lierse were again relegated, but in 1988, they were promoted back to the top division. Keeping up with the elite clubs in Belgium had now become the top priority. Rich clubs such as Anderlecht and Club Bruges reigned supreme in the Belgian League.

1991–1994: Telefusion Belgium sponsored Lierse in these years.

In 1997, Lierse became league champions again, to a large amount of people's surprise. The hotly tipped favourites, Club Bruges, were surprisingly beaten to the title by Lierse.

Two years later (1999), Lierse won the Belgian Cup again.

In May 2018, owner Maged Samy and David Nakhid failed to agree on terms for a possible acquisition, making the future of the club uncertain.

Coaching staff

Managers

Honours

League
Belgian First Division
Champions: 1931–32, 1941–42, 1959–60, 1996–97
Runners-up: 1934–35, 1938–39
Belgian Second Division
Winners: 1926–27, 2009–10
Runners-up (5): 1924–25, 1948–49, 1949–50, 1952–53, 2008–09
Belgian Second Division Final Round
Winners: 1974, 1988, 2006

Cups
Belgian Cup
Winners: 1968–69, 1998–99
Runners-up: 1975–76
Belgian Super Cup
Winners: 1997, 1999

European record 
As of 2019:

Stadium 

Since 1925 Lierse played in the Herman Vanderpoortenstadion often referred to as Lisp. The latter is the location of the stadium in the residential area Lisp. The stadium has a capacity of 14,538.

References

External links 

 
 UEFA page

 
Association football clubs established in 1906
Association football clubs disestablished in 2018
Defunct football clubs in Belgium
1906 establishments in Belgium
Organisations based in Belgium with royal patronage
2018 disestablishments in Belgium
Belgian Pro League clubs
Lier, Belgium
Sport in Antwerp Province